Robert Thomson is a round-the-world cyclist, yachter and longboarder from New Zealand. Beginning in July 2006, he traveled 12,000 kilometres across Asia and Europe from Fukuoka in Japan to  Switzerland by recumbent bicycle, then traveled on to London, England, by skateboard. He completed an unassisted journey of 12,159 km (7,555 miles) across Europe, North America and China by skateboard, starting in Leysin, Switzerland, on 24 June 2007 and finishing in Shanghai, China, on 28 September 2008. His journey is recognised by Guinness World Records as the longest journey by skateboard.

In October 2010, Thomson was residing in Japan and completing his graduate studies.

References

External links 
Article on BVI Beacon
Robert Thomson's website

Living people
New Zealand male cyclists
Place of birth missing (living people)
Year of birth missing (living people)